A Dean of Guild, under Scots law, was one of a group of burgh magistrates who, in later years, had the care of buildings. The leader of the group was known as Lord Dean of Guild.

Originally, the post was held by the head of the Guild brethren of Scottish towns, and dates back to the 12th century. Later, the phrase Dean of Guild also described the courts set up in the 14th century to settle trade disputes. In the 19th century they became responsible for enforcing the burgh's building regulations, a role that was replaced in the mid 20th century by statutory legislation.

This should not be confused with the Dean of a guild, the head of such association.

A more recently formed body - The Court of Deans of Guild of Scotland - exists to incorporate the Guildry organisations of Aberdeen, Arbroath, Ayr, Berwick-upon-Tweed, Brechin, Dundee, Edinburgh, Glasgow, Lanark, Perth and Stirling, and represent them as an umbrella organisation.

See also
Convention of Royal Burghs

References

External links
The Court of Deans of Guild of Scotland website

Scots law general titles
Burghs
Historical legal occupations